Scorpion is a platform/shoot 'em up video game developed and published by Digital Magic Software for the Amiga in 1989. The game was also re-released as Fly Fighter, with another title screen and another order of levels.

Gameplay
The player fights hordes of enemies while traversing five side-scrolling levels, such as a harbour, jungle and ice land, each of which is guarded by a powerful boss. The player character attacks enemies by firing energy bolts from their fingers.

Plot
The protagonist Scorpion is ostensibly fighting to rescue the kidnapped Princess of Scorpia. In a surprise ending, Scorpion kills the evil princess, revealing herself to be her good sister and now-sole heir to the throne.

Reception
The game received the ratings of 93% in Amiga Computing, 69% in Computer and Video Games, 62% in The Games Machine, 60% in CU Amiga, and 47% in The One. According to Amiga Computing, "Everything about Scorpion 
screams quality and style, except for the box illustration which is a little iffy. The game is a zany Gryzor cum Green Beret hybrid with deliriously large, fast characters and plenty of bit noises." Computer and Video Games called it "a competently executed game, let down by some easily corrected errors, and suffer[ing] from not enough outside criticism before release."

References

External links
Sorpion at Amiga Hall of Light
Scorpion at Lemon Amiga
 TheLegacy :: Scorpion

1989 video games
Amiga games
Amiga-only games
Run and gun games
Side-scrolling platform games
Single-player video games
Science fantasy video games
Video games about time travel
Video games developed in the United Kingdom
Video games featuring female protagonists